Steven Christian or Stephen Christian or variation, may refer to:

 Stephen Christian, American singer-songwriter
 Steve Christian (born 1951), Pitcairn Islands politician

See also

 Christian von Steven (1781–1863), botanical name "Steven"; Finnish-Russian botanist and entomologist
 Christian (disambiguation)
 Stephen (disambiguation)
 Christine Stephen (disambiguation)